Porno, Mint & Grime is a B-side compilation album by alternative pop/rock band Self. The album, Self's eighth album, was released for free in 2005 and available in physical form in 2017.  It features B-sides and demos recorded for the album Ornament and Crime, which was also released in 2017 after being delayed for 13 years.

The tracks were originally streamed on the band's website before being offered for download along with complete cover art and liner notes for fans who choose to burn their own CD. The physical release has different cover art.

The song "This is Love" appears on the soundtrack for Another Gay Movie.

Track listing

Personnel
Tracks 1, 2, 3, 5, 6, 8, 9, 10, 12, 13, 14, 15, 16, 17, 19, 20, 21 performed, produced, recorded, mixed by Matt Mahaffey
Mike Mahaffey - guitar on 4, 7, 11
Chris James - engineering on 4, 7, 11, mix on 4, 7, 19, programming on 4, 7, 19
Mac Burrus - guitar on 7, 16, bass on 4, 7, 11, 16, 18, 19
Jason Rawlings - drums on 4
Gang vocal on track 4 - Mahaffey, Mahaffey, Mahaffey, Rawlings, Burrus, James, Kinnon

External links
Porno, Mint & Grime download

Albums free for download by copyright owner
Self (band) albums
2005 albums